Luke Esser (born August 26, 1961) is an American attorney, journalist, and politician who served as the chairman of the Washington State Republican Party from 2007 to 2011. He was elected on January 27, 2007, when he defeated incumbent chairwoman Diane Tebelius, was re-elected in 2009, but lost to Kirby Wilbur in 2011.

Esser is a former Republican senator in the Washington State Senate, representing the 48th Legislative District.  He served as the Majority floor leader for the Washington State Senate. He was defeated for re-election in 2006 by Democratic challenger and former Republican lawmaker Rodney Tom. In the 2004 Republican primary for the eighth Congressional district of Washington he finished third, behind Diane Tebelius and King County Sheriff Dave Reichert. Reichert went on to win the general election and served in that seat until he retired in 2019.

For much of the 1990s, Esser was a contributing writer to Fantasy Football Index, the nation's oldest and largest circulating fantasy football publication.

Esser lives in East Bellevue, Washington and attended St. Louise Parish Catholic Church. He is a graduate of Interlake High School and three times from the University of Washington: Double majored in Editorial Journalism & Accounting, earned a J.D. degree and an M.B.A. degree.

2008 Caucuses

Esser called the Republican presidential caucus of Washington for John McCain, on February 9, 2008, after 87% of the vote had been counted, and 200 votes separated John McCain from Mike Huckabee. Huckabee had been leading early on as the votes were counted, but after McCain took the lead, Esser published a press release declaring McCain the apparent victor.

As the remaining votes were counted, McCain maintained his lead and won.

References

External links

 Campaign website
 Washington State Republican Party website
 Washington State Republican Party leadership biographies
 College Op-Ed written by Luke Esser on Suppressing Vote for Republican Advantage, UW Daily, Nov. 3, 1986

1961 births
Living people
Republican Party Washington (state) state senators
State political party chairs of Washington (state)
Republican Party members of the Washington House of Representatives